George Carlyle Emslie, Baron Emslie,  (6 December 1919 – 21 November 2002) was a Scottish judge.

Educated at the High School of Glasgow and the University of Glasgow, he was commissioned in the Argyll and Sutherland Highlanders and served in World War II in North Africa, Italy, Greece and Austria, rising to the rank of brigade major from 1944 to 1946. He was made a Member of the Order of the British Empire (MBE) in 1946.

He became an advocate in 1948 and served as an Advocate Depute from 1955. He became a Queen's Counsel in 1957.

He was Sheriff of Perth and Angus from 1963
to 1966 and Dean of the Faculty of Advocates from 1965
to 1970. He was appointed a Senator of the College of Justice in 1970 following the death of Lord Guthrie
and was Lord President of the Court of Session and Lord Justice General from 1972
to 1989.  He was appointed a Privy Counsellor in 1972 and Fellow of the Royal Society of Edinburgh in 1987.

He was created a life peer as Baron Emslie, of Potterton in the District of Gordon on 11 February 1980 but didn't take his seat in the House of Lords until 1990.

Two of his sons also became Senators of the College of Justice. Derek (born 1949), became a judge in 1997 with the judicial title Lord Kingarth, and his older brother Nigel (born 1947) was raised to the bench in 2001 with father's title of Lord Emslie.

References

External links
Lord Emslie. The Guardian. (2002-12-03). Retrieved 2019-04-09.
Lord Emslie. The Scotsman. (2002-11-22). Retrieved 2019-04-09.
Lord Emslie. The Telegraph. (2002-11-23). Retrieved 2019-04-09.

1919 births
2002 deaths
Crossbench life peers
People educated at the High School of Glasgow
Alumni of the University of Glasgow
Argyll and Sutherland Highlanders officers
Members of the Order of the British Empire
Members of the Privy Council of the United Kingdom
Fellows of the Royal Society of Edinburgh
British Army personnel of World War II
Lords President of the Court of Session
Lords Justice-General
Deans of the Faculty of Advocates
Emslie
Scottish sheriffs
Scottish King's Counsel
20th-century King's Counsel
Life peers created by Elizabeth II